The eternal feminine, a concept first introduced by Johann Wolfgang von Goethe in his play Faust (1832), is a transcendental ideality of the feminine or womanly abstracted from the attributes, traits and behaviors of a large number of women and female figures. In Faust, these include historical, fictional, and mythological women, goddesses, and even female personifications of abstract qualities such as wisdom. As an ideal, the eternal feminine has an ethical component, which means that not all women contribute to it. Those who, for example, spread malicious gossip about other women or even just conform slavishly to their society's conventions are by definition non-contributors. Since the eternal feminine appears without explanation (though not without preparation) only in the last two lines of the play, it is left to the reader to work out which traits and behaviors it involves and which of the various women and female figures in the play contribute them. On these matters Goethe scholars have achieved a certain degree of consensus. The eternal feminine also has societal, cosmic and metaphysical dimensions.

Since Goethe's time the concept of the eternal feminine has been used by a number of philosophers, psychologists, psychoanalysts, theologians, feminists, poets and novelists. By some it has been employed or developed in ways congruent with Goethe's original conception, but by others in ways that depart from it considerably in one or more respects, not always felicitously. A complicating factor is that when the expression "eternal feminine" passed into popular usage, it tended (except among the knowledgeable) to lose any connection with Goethe's original idea and be taken as referring to the prevailing cultural stereotypes of what constitutes the feminine.

Goethe
The concept of the "eternal feminine" was introduced by Goethe at the end of Faust, Part Two (1832):

Although Goethe does not introduce the eternal feminine until the last two lines of the play, he prepared for its appearance at the outset. "Equally pertinent in this regard," writes J. M. van der Laan, "are Gretchen and Helen, who alternate with each other from start to finish and ultimately combine with others to constitute the Eternal-Feminine" At the beginning of Part I, Act IV, Faust glimpses in the passing clouds "a godlike female form" in which he discerns Juno, Leda, Aurora, Helen and Gretchen. This "lovely form" does not dissolve, but rises into the aether, drawing, Faust says, "the best of my soul forth with itself"—rather as the eternal feminine does in the last line of the play. Also embodiments of the eternal feminine are four other women who appear with the redeemed Gretchen at the end of Part II, Act V: Magna Peccatrix (the "great sinner" who anointed Jesus), Mulier Samaritana (the Samaritan woman at the well), Maria Aegytiaca (Mary of Egypt), and Mater Gloriosa (Mary, mother of Jesus). Then there are Galatea, who appears in Part II, Act II as a surrogate for Aphrodite; the Graces Aglaia (representing beauty), Hegemone (representing creativity), and Euphrosyne (representing joy), who feature briefly in Part II, Act I; and even the uncanny Mothers, whom Faust visits in Part II, Act I to conjure up Helen. Sophia, the biblical personification of divine wisdom, does not appear per se in Faust, but she is subtly present in Helen, not to mention the other women; her attributes (Wisdom 7:23–26) recall those of the female figures manifested in the clouds; and she is alluded to in Goethe's repeated references to eternal light (cf. Wisdom 7:26). Significantly, the women who contribute to the eternal feminine often appear in groups, and at times one of them calls up the image of another. In Helen there are hints of Gretchen (in the cloud scene) and Sophia; Galatea appears as an Aphrodite figure. The eternal feminine is a communal affair, a sisterhood.

However, not all the female figures who appear in the play contribute to the eternal feminine. As van der Laan notes, "Lieschen, who gossips about the misfortunes of Barbara, pregnant out of wedlock, does not possess the qualities later to be associated with the Eternal-Feminine. These qualities are also lacking in the witches of the Walpurgis Night. Only a select number of the play's many feminine figures contribute something of themselves to the construction of the ideality Goethe finally reveals at the end of the play.

The subversive side of Goethe's eternal feminine is highlighted by Nietzsche scholar Carol Diethe, who observes that Goethe, like Nietzsche in a rather different way later, used the concept to challenge the "blinkered bourgeois morality" of nineteenth-century Germany: "In Goethe's case, that morality ought to have put the child murderess Gretchen beyond the pale: at the end of Faust I (1808), she is not just a fallen woman but a felon, which is precisely why Goethe places her in the redemptive role, forcing his wealthy Weimar theater audience to show tolerance, willy-nilly."

A host of female figures—van der Laan mentions at least fifteen, not counting the Mothers—contribute something of themselves and their various symbolic possibilities to the eternal feminine. The range of connotations is extraordinarily diverse. While the eternal feminine symbolizes such qualities as beauty, truth, love, mercy, and grace, it "also personifies the transcendent realm of ultimate being, of divine wisdom and creative power which forever exceeds human reach, but at the same time ever draws us into itself." Goethe's "Eternal Feminine," writes the Korean-American philosopher T. K. Seung, "is the supreme cosmic power for the governance of the world." The "feminine principle", which "operates in every human heart", is "a cosmic principle." Seung sees a parallel to the Taoist descriptions of Yin and Yang, observing that in Chinese philosophy "Yin is the feminine principle; Yang is the masculine principle.... But Yin is the mother of all things. The primacy of Yin over Yang is expressed by the phrase 'Yin and Yang.' The Chinese never say 'Yang and Yin.' The ancient Chinese belief [is] that Yin is stronger than Yang." Citing the opinion of Goethe scholar Hans Arens that "the Eternal-Feminine is not simply to be equated with love. Rather, it is the eternal or divine which reveals itself in the feminine," van der Laan concludes: "As the symbolic representation of divine wisdom and creative power, the Eternal-Feminine can never be grasped or possessed. Beyond all human reach and comprehension, the eternal and divine always draws Faust and humanity onward toward itself."

It is to be noted that the Goethean concept of the eternal feminine is an ideal for both men and women, to the same degree, if not in the same way. This is shown in the use of common-gendered terms like "humanity", "people" or "us" to refer to those whom it draws upward  and on. In Goethe's own words, "The eternal-feminine draws us on high." As he realized, encompassing the range of human experience requires transcending the traditional stuff of patriarchy, as it tends to efface the feminine. His introduction in his magnum opus of the eternal feminine is an attempt to redress this imbalance and achieve a more comprehensive vision. In T. K. Seung's words, "the noble forms of the Eternal Feminine"—symbolized in the play by the "godlike female form" in the clouds in which Faust discerns Juno, Leda, Aurora, Helen and Gretchen—"are Goethe's transcendent forms, which stand above all positive norms and which enable us to transcend the narrow perspective of our individual self. This power of transcendence is provided by the Eternal Feminine."

Feminist Transcendentalism

Margaret Fuller
The right to pursue self-culture (Bildung) regardless of sex, race, or social position was at the heart of the project of nineteenth-century New England Transcendentalism. "Self-culture," declared Transcendentalist lecturer John Albee in 1885, "must be held up and measured on the Goethean plan." In her book Woman in the Nineteenth Century (1845), feminist Transcendentalist Margaret Fuller praised Goethe's portrayal of women in his writings: "He aims at a pure self-subsistence, and free development of any powers with which they may be gifted by nature as much for them as for men. They are units [individuals] addressed as souls. Accordingly, the meeting between man and woman, as represented by him, is equal and noble." In her essay "Goethe" (1841), Fuller had written, "Goethe always represents the highest principle on the feminine form." The prime example of that is the eternal feminine.

For Fuller, "man and woman... are the two halves of one thought.... I believe that the development of the one cannot be effected without that of the other." Furthermore, "male and female... are perpetually passing into one another.... There is no wholly masculine man, no purely feminine woman." She expressed this idea in terms drawn from classical mythology: "Man partakes of the feminine in the Apollo, woman of the masculine in the Minerva." One of the most warlike of the classical goddesses, Minerva embodied a fierce independence. Fuller had no doubt that women were thoroughly capable of being sea-captains or military leaders and that there would one day be "a female Newton".

Ednah Dow Cheney
Fuller's tragically premature death means that for a considered reflection on the eternal feminine from a feminist Transcendentalist perspective we must go to Ednah Dow Cheney, who in 1885 gave a lecture at the Concord School of Philosophy on "Das Ewig-Weibliche". (Cheney also discusses the eternal feminine in her 1897 address, "The Reign of Womanhood", and in her memoir, Reminiscences, published in 1902.) Goethe's lines on the eternal feminine, she noted, come at the very end of his last and greatest work: "We may almost say that they are the last important utterance of his mind, the climax of all his thought, all his experience. They are the final summing up in his thought of human life." She then asked why Goethe, rather than using some "more general term" such as "Divine Humanity",  found "his true expression in 'Das Ewig-Weibliche'? Why does he use the word, which implies difference of sex, and the eternally directing function of one aspect of the eternal thought, instead of employing a phrase that would express the whole?" Her answer was that Goethe wished to express "the essential nature" of the power which he thus invoked: "It is not the feminine in its manifestation"—i.e. actual female-sexed bodies—"but in its original character" This "original character" is what she had called a little earlier "one aspect of the eternal thought". Ontologically, it is prior to women (or woman), but it tends to "manifest" in them (rather than in men).

Cheney then attempts to define what this "aspect" is. She surveys Goethe's novels, poems, plays, autobiographical writings, even his scientific works on botany and colour theory, and concludes that it is relation. In Goethe's view, she writes, "It is for the truth of relation that we come into mortal existence,—not to know ourselves, not to save ourselves, not to be ourselves except in relation.... The relation of Man to Woman is typical of this great law.... Throughout the universe, only relation is creative.... When Man and Woman see each other, they begin to apprehend the Universe." Mere identity—the self prior to relation—is "not complete". It "can only be perfected by fitting itself to others, accepting the welfare of others as more its own than its own personality." She quotes Goethe scholar Herman Grimm: "Goethe was persuaded that all phenomena stand in mutual relation, and therefore nothing can be demonstrated by the study of isolated parts." She observes that "the idea of womanhood always suggests that of relation, symbolizing as she does the attractive forces of existence, beauty winning to union,...in one all-comprehensive word, love." Or, in more abstract terms, "The attractive principle is at once attraction which stimulates action and the centripetal power which holds action true to its centre." This puts woman "in the van of the world's progress of evolution". The "highest human relation" is love. "Woman's misery, man's degradation, is the result of the broken law of love." Women know this better than men because they test life "by a more delicate analysis than masculine logic supplies". They consider "things in their relations". That is why in "the great work in which Goethe sought to read the riddle of life,... das Weibliche is the moving power". The "one simple thought" that runs all through Faust is expressed "in the last grand verse". What is revealed there is "that which enters into every faith, which underlies the beautiful in art, the ideal in philosophy, the essence of morality, the meaning of life. It is the sense of the relation of the individual to the universal. We never think, never can think, of the feminine alone. It is not what separates her from others, but what gives the power of union, which makes her feminine, and so creative. And the masculine knows itself only in relation to the feminine. So it is that the eternally feminine 'draws us by sweet leadings' of beauty to love, to union, to new creation."

At this point, however, Cheney confronts a difficulty which she knows will have occurred to some of her listeners, one which she pondered to the end of her life. "But in using these words," she says, "we must remember that these human forms which we live among, and which flit past us like the changing phantoms in Goethe's half-mocking drama are but shadows and types." Sex, as it has evolved from its earliest beginnings "to its beautiful outcome in the highest human relation,... is a shadowing forth of a... duality", a "double strand"—the masculine and the feminine. But if this "double strand... represents duality, it equally represents unity and universality." We "may as well divide the rainbow by arbitrary lines" as seek to separate characteristics so "unstable and interchangeable", so "constantly blended in manifestation... and in the highest natures the most perfectly". Earlier in the lecture, she had spoken of how impossible it is to trace the distinction of sex in mental life: "In externals, in the realm of form, it is easy enough to make divisions, but in any finer sense it can only be felt, no analysis has ever been keen enough to detect it." Common stereotypes, such as that men are governed by judgment while women are swayed by feelings, are "a delusive cheat". Their wide acceptance had led the Transcendentalist writer Theodore Parker to argue that "in a semi-barbarous civilization, such as ours still is," men take any suggestion that sexual difference extends to the mind as "the pretext for a claim of sovereignty, and a power of oppression" over women.

Parker's claim that "There is no sex in souls," however, does not convince Cheney. "Masculine" and "feminine" may be but "shadows and types", but they can hardly be dispensed with. The best course, in her view, is to be pragmatic, to give them meanings that, rather than conveying harmful stereotypes, can actually be useful from a feminist and a societal perspective. The definitions she offers, while nonarbitrary—they are in line with her idea that the core meaning of the eternal feminine is relation—are extremely general as well as highly abstract (the terminology is largely drawn from physics), and are clearly to be taken metaphorically rather than literally—that is, as pointers to something which by its very nature ("shadows and types") eludes precise definition. The masculine represents force, the feminine attraction. The masculine is centrifugal, the feminine is centripetal. The masculine stands for apartness ("Faust is the unrelated man"), the feminine for union. Typically, in a society in which the masculine dominates, man has "largely taken the material aggressive part of the life of the world, and... woman, in so far truly his worst enemy, has yielded to his exactions and fostered his pride of authority and self-love." Such a society is harmful to both sexes, but especially to women. Indeed, for Cheney, the world's most fearful evil "is the wrong against woman,... which seems to be rooted in the ages, and to-day casts its poisonous slime over all countries, and all societies". What is required, therefore, is radical reform—the loftiest goal, Fuller had said, of the fully realized soul—so that "evident wrongs are eliminated and both sexes will develop in freedom and finally into perfect harmony". This harmony is not achievable without the free development of women, Ideally, the masculine and the feminine "play an equal part in the great drama of Life". Given the disharmony between the sexes and in society in general, however, "as the feminine represents attraction, this is the leading principle which draws us upward and on."

Nietzsche
Friedrich Nietzsche had an ambivalent attitude to the eternal feminine. As Carol Diethe notes, on the one hand he mocked the self-righteous Wilhelmine women who fancied themselves its embodiment in relation to their husbands when actually they were (in Nietzsche's opinion) morally and spiritually bankrupt. On the other hand his respect for Goethe meant he could not reject the notion outright, and for a time he even seems to have hoped that Lou Andreas-Salomé—a woman who also fascinated Rilke and Freud—would be to him a kind of spiritualized manifestation of the eternal feminine as helpmeet or muse. To his intense disappointment, however, she declined this role. Possibly, Diethe says, this was what made his tone so bitter when he came to attack the Wilhelmine version of the eternal feminine. Diethe also suggests that perhaps it is no coincidence that the phrase Ewige Wiederkehr (Eternal Recurrence) is remarkably similar to Ewig-Weibliche. Nietzsche had discussed the Eternal Recurrence with Lou Salomé on Monte Sacro in Rome in 1882. Frances Nesbitt Oppel also sees a connection here. She views the language of earth-symbolism—mother earth symbolizing transience and perishability—in Thus Spoke Zarathustra (1883–1892) as feminine, indicating that Nietzsche wants to emphasize the feminine nature of his doctrine: "The 'eternal feminine' in Zarathustra is the 'eternal return' which draws us ever downward, to the earth, to time, to the transitory." The feminine principle is articulated by Nietzsche within a continuity of life and death, based in large part on his readings of ancient Greek literature, since in Greek culture both childbirth and the care of the dead were managed by women.

Since, unlike Diethe, Oppel fails to distinguish between Goethe's eternal feminine and the Wilhelmine version of it, she tends to describe the former in terms more appropriate to the latter. Referring to its appearance at the end of Faust, for instance, she writes, "This mode of the eternal feminine reproduces the social injunction on the two-sex model to be wives, mothers, and moral guardians of men, and of their families." She is on firmer ground when she observes that the Nietzschean critique of the eternal feminine "is tied to another equally provocative polemic directed at Christianity". In Daybreak (1881), Nietzsche writes of the hostility of "men of conscience" such as himself "to the whole of European feminism (or idealism, if you prefer that word), which is forever 'drawing us upward' and precisely thereby 'bringing us down'". For an anti-democrat like Nietzsche, Christianity, idealism and feminism were all part of the general levelling down of Western modernity to a mediocre 'herd' which was destroying its capacity to produce the exceptional individuals necessary to survival and growth. Thus, in The Gay Science (1882), he tells us that "'feminism' means 'of the feminine,'... connoting 'belief in God and Christian conscience: that is... feminism. It means idealism, in whatever form." In Twilight of the Idols (1888), he writes: "The Imitatio Christi is one of the books I cannot hold in my hands without experiencing a physical resistance: it exhales a parfum of the 'eternal feminine'." In Beyond Good and Evil (1886), he notes the parallels between what "Dante and Goethe believed of woman—the former when he sang 'ella guardava suso, ed io in lei' [she (Beatrice) looked upward, and I with/through her], the latter when he translated it as 'the eternal womanly draws us upward'."

In Beyond Good and Evil, Nietzsche says that his views on women depend on something unteachable deep down—that what we call our "convictions" about the sexes are mere "signposts to the problem which we are—or, better, the great stupidity which we are". After this admission, he hopes "that I will be allowed to speak out a few truths" about women, so long as people realize that they are "only my truths". Julian Young writes: "He concedes, in other words, that his views may be infected by a degree of prejudice. The source of prejudice this extremely self-aware man has in mind is surely obvious: the trauma of the Salomé affair." Young observes that by 1885 "the majority of Nietzsche's friends and admirers were not just women but feminist women", such as Malwida von Meysenbug, Helen Zimmern and Meta von Salis. Nietzsche therefore invites his feminist friends "to scrutinize his views very carefully with an eye to separating the philosophical from the possibly pathological." And that is what they did. As Young notes, "Nietzsche's views on women are not merely offensive to modern opinion. They were offensive, too, to progressive opinion in the nineteenth century, including of course the opinion of many educated women." Nevertheless, many feminists were attracted to Nietzsche's philosophy by the accord they perceived between his message of liberation and their own. Their solution was to treat his anti-feminism as a personal quirk rather than an essential part of his philosophy. Young cites the example of Meta von Salis, who wrote that "a man of Nietzsche's breadth of vision and sureness of instinct has the right to get things wrong in one instance". Nietzsche, she thought, had made a reasonable but false generalization from the run of contemporary women to "the eternal feminine" and had failed to see that, while "the woman of the future who realizes a higher ideal of power and beauty in harmonious coexistence has not yet arrived", she will arrive.

"Perhaps," Nietzsche wrote in 1888, "I am the first psychologist of the eternal feminine. They all love me." In the second sentence he is clearly referring to his feminist friends; in the first not so much, since, as the comment by Meta von Salis just cited indicates, their conception of the eternal feminine was rather different from his (as he was well aware). The whole passage, notes Penelope Deutscher, "seems rather tongue-in-cheek". Quite how convoluted interpreting Nietzsche on the eternal feminine can be is suggested by another comment by Deutscher: "we might say that any notion of the eternal feminine that Nietzsche does invoke to denounce the idealist notion of an eternal feminine is a re-valued 'eternal feminine' and not the 'same', idealist eternal feminine he denounces".

"Man is a coward when confronted with the Eternal Feminine," Nietzsche wrote in 1888, "—and the females know it." As he explains in Beyond Good and Evil, "That in woman which arouses respect and often enough fear is her nature, which is 'more natural' than man's, her genuine, cunning, beast-of-prey suppleness, the tiger's claws under the glove, the naïveté of her egoism, her ineducability and inner wildness, and how incomprehensible, capacious and volatile her desires and virtues are." To go from "this dangerous and beautiful cat 'woman'" to "'woman as clerk'" is "stupidity,... an almost masculine stupidity". It doesn't even lessen the problem of abuse. "To lose an instinct for the ground on which she is surest of victory, to neglect to practice the art of her own proper weapons,... to seek with virtuous audacity to destroy man's faith that there is a fundamentally different ideal concealed in woman, that there is something eternally, necessarily feminine...—what does all this mean if not a crumbling away of feminine instinct, a loss of femininity?" Femininity is both "natural" and an art. In The Gay Science, Nietzsche had written that women are "first of all and above all actresses,... they 'put on something' even when they take off everything. Woman is so artistic." There is much here to arouse the ire of feminists—though some qualities Nietzsche ascribes to women, like egoism and ineducability, he also ascribes to himself, and he utilizes metaphors of animality, acting and concealment (particularly masks) for both sexes. There are also ideas, however, from which some feminists in the following decade were to take inspiration.

New Woman
The New Woman was an influential feminist ideal of the 1890s. She has been succinctly described as "intelligent, educated, emancipated, independent and self-supporting". The New Woman was often associated with the eternal feminine. One representative article from 1895, after claiming that it is impossible to go anywhere or read anything "without being continually reminded of the subject which lady-writers love to call the Woman Question", observed: "'The Eternal Feminine,' the 'Revolt of the Daughters,' the Woman's Volunteer Movement, Women's Clubs, are significant expressions and effective landmarks."

Owing to her outspokenness about female desire, George Egerton (Mary Chavelita Dunne) was the most controversial of the New Women writers. Not only did she make the earliest reference to Nietzsche in English literature, but he is the most frequent reference in her texts. Unsurprisingly, the eternal feminine in her fiction has a strongly Nietzschean stamp. In "A Cross Line", the first story in Keynotes (1893), Egerton's first collection, the female protagonist laughs softly to herself at "the denseness of man", musing that "the wisest of them can only say we are enigmas. Each one of them sits about solving the riddle of the ewig weibliche—and well it is that the workings of our hearts are closed to them, that we are cunning enough or great enough to seem to be what they would have us, rather than be what we are. But few of them have had the insight to find out the key to our seeming contradictions.... They have all overlooked the eternal wildness, the untamed primitive savage temperament that lurks in the mildest, best woman. Deep in through ages of convention this primeval trait burns, an untameable quantity that may be concealed but is never eradicated by culture—the keynote of woman's witchcraft and woman's strength." In passages like this, as Iveta Jusová observes, Egerton apparently "re-asserts the traditional unproductive binary division between (female) nature and (male) culture", but this assumption is "in the end undermined by Egerton's own discourse", which "exposes this postulate as impossible and locates presumably precultural 'nature' and desire within a larger concept of culture". Or, as Elke D'hoker argues (as paraphrased by Eleanor Fitzsimons), "Egerton avoids essentialism by presenting a pluralistic expression of women's desires."

Zora Neale Hurston
In a much-quoted passage from Zora Neale Hurston's essay "How It Feels To Be Colored Me" (1928), the eternal feminine, including its cosmic aspect, contributes significantly to her secure sense of self-worth as a black American woman:

As one scholar observes immediately before quoting the above passage, "If one wanted to find an example of a black American woman who is at ease with being black and yet being convinced that she is an authentic part of greater humankind, one should read Hurston's essay." Hurston continues:

Later developments
In the last third of the twentieth century, the eternal feminine was often regarded, typically without reference to Goethe's original conception, as a psychological archetype or philosophical principle that idealizes an immutable concept of "woman". It was seen as one component of gender essentialism, the belief that men and women have different core "essences" that cannot be altered by time or environment. Such a conceptual ideal was particularly vivid in the 19th century, when women were often depicted as angelic, responsible for drawing men upward on a moral and spiritual path. Among those virtues variously regarded as essentially feminine are "modesty, gracefulness, purity, delicacy, civility, compliancy, reticence, chastity, affability, [and] politeness".

Sandra Gilbert and Susan Gubar state that for Goethe, "woman" symbolized pure contemplation, in contrast to masculine action. If by "woman" they mean "the eternal feminine" (they are not the same thing), their statement is incorrect. Contemplation is certainly one of the myriad qualities symbolized in the eternal feminine, but so is agency, that is, the capacity to act.

In classical music
The concluding lines of Goethe's Faust on the "eternal feminine" were set to music by Robert Schumann in the last chorus of his Scenes from Goethe's Faust, by Franz Liszt at the end of the last movement of his Faust Symphony, and by Gustav Mahler in the last chorus of his Eighth Symphony.

In popular culture
In Wide is the Gate, the fourth novel of the "Lanny Budd" series by Upton Sinclair, Lanny says to Gertrud Schultz, "What Goethe calls das ewig weibliche is seldom out of my consciousness; I don’t think it is ever entirely out of any man’s consciousness."

See also 
 Cult of Domesticity
 Erich Neumann (psychologist)
 Gender role
 Ideal womanhood
 Yamato nadeshiko
 New Woman
 Separate Spheres
The Angel in the House
 Thealogy

References 

1832 introductions
Archetypes
Feminist philosophy
Philosophical anthropology
Women by role
Johann Wolfgang von Goethe
Juno (mythology)
Mary, mother of Jesus